The Innovation Credit Union iPlex is a 2,879-seat multi-purpose arena in Swift Current, Saskatchewan, Canada. The arena was built in 1967 as a Canadian Centennial project and originally known as the Centennial Civic Centre. In 2007, Swift Current city council approved a $14 million expansion to the Centennial Civic Centre. Construction of the hockey-curling complex was completed in fall 2007.

It is home to the Swift Current Broncos ice hockey team, Home Hardware AAA Midget Legionnaires ice hockey team, and Swift Current Rampage lacrosse team. It hosted the 2010 World Women's Curling Championship as well as the 2016 Ford World Women's Curling Championship. The naming rights are held by Innovation Credit Union.

References

External links
 Credit Union i-plex - City of Swift Current

Indoor ice hockey venues in Canada
Indoor lacrosse venues in Canada
Indoor arenas in Saskatchewan
Sports venues in Saskatchewan
Buildings and structures in Swift Current
Western Hockey League arenas
1967 establishments in Saskatchewan
Sports venues completed in 1967